Chicos de Barrio is a Mexican musical group formed in 1995 in Torreon, Coahuila, Mexico. The group has 11 members, of which the percussion, harmony and swing are predominant. The group's music combines urban, hip hop, salsa, vallenato, reggae and other genres.

Career
Chicos de Barrio formed in 1995 in Torreón, Coahuila, performing locally and in surrounding areas. They were discovered by producer Amador Granados, who offered to record their first album, Triste Lagunera, for the record label MCM (Metro Casa Musical). The album was recorded in Corona, California. Granados was sold the reproduction rights for the band's music. It took one year of work before the album was released.

The following year, Chicos de Barrio began a tour of the United States. While still touring, Jesus Dimas Maciel and Juan Angel Najera set up local events around Texas, in San Antonio, Austin, Houston, and other cities. The group later played concerts as support acts for artists including Michael Salgado, Bobby Pulido, and Intocable, and further gigs around the United States and in Mexico. They were invited by the governor of Coahuila to perform at various Mexican nominations, and also performed live on television shows such as  Furia Musical, Hoy, Sabado Gigante, Despierta America, El Gordo y la Flaca, Primer Impacto.

They were recruited by Warner Bros. Records to perform and record the theme tune to ¡Mucha Lucha!, which was broadcast on Kids' WB and Cartoon Network; as well as performing the cumbia song "Güe - güe - güepa" in the What's New, Scooby-Doo? episode "3-D Struction".

In 2011 Dimas Maciel left the group to follow a religious path, but he continues to manage the group. At the start of 2013, the other lead singer, Susana Ortiz, also left the group. The band has since recruited two new vocalists: Gabriel Grijalva Blanco, formerly of La Mera Vena, and the new female vocalist, Sammy Debaral, from Monclova, Mexico.

The group were the winners of the "Mejor Tropical" award at the Latin Music Awards 2010.

Complete discography 

 Triste Lagunera (1995)
 Te Invito A Bailar (1996)
 Salió Mejor (1997)
 En Tu Corazón (1998)
 Vato Loco (1999)
 La Lola (2000)
 Dominando Y Controlando (2001)
 En La Esquina (2002)
 Barrio Mix (2003)
 Reggae Hop (2004)
 Puros Vatos... Choca Y Rebota (2005)
 Década (2006)
 The Best Of Da Comark (2007)
 Güe, Güe, Güepa (2008)
 Sibirikipau (2009)
 XV Aniversario (2010)
 XV Aniversario Vol. 2 (2010)
 Anécdotas Del Barrio (2011)
 Me Marcho Pero No Me Voy (2012)
 De México A Colombia (2013)
 Juntos Por Siempre (2014)
 XX Aniversario (2015)
 XX Aniversario Vol. 2 (2015)
 El Reencuentro (2016)
 Vaya, Vaya  (2017)
 Evolution (2018)
 Los Cholos Han Regresado (2019)
 XXV Aniversario Tributo A Los Bukis (2020)
 Unidos Salimos Adelante (2021)
 Los Reyes De La Cumbia Lagunera (2022)
 Ya Te La Sabes... Loco (2023)

Televisión appearances 
 Hoy (Televisa)
 Vida TV (Televisa)
 Se Vale (Televisa)
 Sabadazo (Televisa)
 Cuéntamelo Ya...al fin (Televisa)
 Otro Rollo (Televisa)
 No Manches (Televisa)
 Turnocturno (Televisa)
 Tempranito (TV Azteca)
 Ventaneando (TV Azteca)
 Corazón Grupero (TV Azteca)
 Enamorándonos (TV Azteca)
 La Chicuela Presenta (TV Azteca)
 Las Noches Del Fútbol (Multimedios)
 Es Show (Multimedios)
 Acábatelo (Multimedios)
 Viva La Ví (Multimedios)
 Gruperisimo (Multimedios)
 Nigth Show (Multimedios)
 Taller Abierto (Multimedios)
 Volumen 4 (Multimedios)
 Mira Que Bonito (Multimedios)
 Guerra De Chistes (Telehit)
 Las Lavanderas (Telehit)
 Platanito Show (Telehit)
 El Show De Oscar Burgos (Telehit)
 Desde El Bar Con José Luis Zagar (Youtube)

International tour 

 México
 Estados Unidos
 Canadá
 Colombia
 Venezuela
 Ecuador
 Cuba
 Argentina
 Brasil
 Chile
 Costa Rica
 Guatemala
 Nicaragua
 El Salvador
 Honduras
chicos de barrio y los capi son las únicas agrupaciones laguneras que han tenido giras internacionales por estos países ya mencionados otras agrupaciones solamente se han presentado en méxico y estados unidos.

Members 

 Dimas (vocals) (1995–present)
 Samy (vocals) (2017–present)
 Pancho (congas) (2010–present)
 Ponchito ¨la Calaka¨ (accordion) (2022–present)
 Poncho (drums) (2020–present)
 Lupe (trumpet) (2010–present)
 Luigi (trumpet) (2010–present)
 Josh (saxophone) (2010–present)
 Yael (güiro) (2010–present)
 Luis (bass guitar) (2020–present)
 Betillo (guitar) (2021–present)
 David (keyboard) (2015–present)
<ref>https://www.youtube.com/chicosdebarrio

Former members

 Yiyo (keyboard) (1995 - 2015)
 Susana (vocals) (1995 - 2017)
 Nicho Colombia (accordion and vocals) (1995 - 2020)
 Pájaro (drums) (2000 - 2020) 
 Meny (bass guitar) (2000 - 2020) 
 Capi (drums) (1995 - 1999)
 Juanito (trumpet) (1995 - 1999)
 Quiro (bass guitar) (1995 - 1999)
 Sigua (congas) (1995 - 1999)
 Poncho (acoustic and electric guitar) (1995 - 2020)
 Pavas (güiro) (1995 - 1999)
 Sergio (saxophone) (1995 - 1999)
 Carlos Machado (trumpet) 2002
 Richie (tenor saxophone) (1995 - 1999)
 Freddy Guevara

References

External links
  Archived from the original on October 12, 2008.

Musical groups established in 1995
Mexican musical groups
Musicians from Coahuila
People from Torreón